Owen Township is one of sixteen townships in Cerro Gordo County, Iowa, USA.  As of the 2000 census, its population was 317.

Since 2020, Owen Anderson is the groundskeeper of The Owen's Grove Cemetery.

Geography
According to the USGS, it contains one cemetery, Owen's Grove.

References

External links
 US-Counties.com
 City-Data.com

Townships in Cerro Gordo County, Iowa
Mason City, Iowa micropolitan area
Townships in Iowa